Daewoo Ngatapang was a Palauan association football club founded in 2004 which began competing in the Palau Soccer League, the top level league in Palau, in the inaugural 2004 season, known as the Palau Soccer Association Local League, when they were crowned champions. Whilst they definitely did not compete in the 2006–07 season, they may well have competed in other season where information is missing. However, the next season it is known for certain that they participated is 2010, when they were crowned champions for the seoncd time. Only Team Bangladesh have won more titles.

Players

2004 Squad

References

Football clubs in Palau
2004 establishments in Palau